Pravindra Kumar is an Indian biophysicist, bioinformatician, biochemist and professor at the Indian Institute of Technology Roorkee. He is known for his work on protein-protein interactions, protein engineering and structure-based drug design. The Department of Biotechnology of the Government of India awarded him the National Bioscience Award for Career Development in 2015, one of the highest Indian science awards, for his contributions to biosciences.

Biography 

Pravindra Kumar, after completing his master's studies at Chaudhary Charan Singh University in 1995, did his doctoral studies in biophysics at the All India Institute of Medical Sciences Delhi while working as a senior demonstrator there. He earned his PhD in 2001 and proceeded to the US where he did his post doctoral studies at Purdue University. Returning to India in 2005, he joined the Indian Institute of Technology Roorkee as an assistant professor and holds the position of an associate professor since 2012. At IIT Roorkee, he has held several positions such as those of associate dean (corporate interaction), chief advisor (sports), deputy chief advisor (students club) and warden.

Professional profile 

Pravindra Kumar focuses his interest on protein engineering and interactions as well as drug design and leads a team of researchers. In 2017, his team worked on Chlorogenic acid, an aromatic compound found naturally in plants like coffea and their biochemical and structural studies using x-ray crystallography techniques revealed that the compound had anti-bacterial properties. The discovery is reported to have opportunities in the development of a new class of antibiotics as the compound clings to the chorismate mutase enzyme in the shikimate pathway which assists in the synthesis of aromatic amino acids and this could inhibit the growth of bacteria. His studies have been documented by way of a number of articles and ResearchGate, an online repository of scientific articles has listed 117 of them.

Awards and honors 
The Department of Biotechnology (DBT) of the Government of India awarded him the National Bioscience Award for Career Development, one of the highest Indian science awards in 2015.

= Selected bibliography

Selected bibliography

See also 

 Chikungunya
 Bacillus subtilis

Notes

References

External links 
 

N-BIOS Prize recipients
Indian scientific authors
Living people
Year of birth missing (living people)
Indian medical writers
Scientists from Uttarakhand
Indian biophysicists
Indian biochemists
Indian bioinformaticians
Chaudhary Charan Singh University alumni
All India Institute of Medical Sciences, New Delhi alumni
Academic staff of IIT Roorkee